Malin Beg (Gaeilge: Málain Bhig) is a small Gaeltacht village south of Glencolumbkille, County Donegal, Ireland. It is famous for its beach, the Silver Strand.

Demographics

References

Gaeltacht places in County Donegal